Arıqıran (also, Anygyran and Arygyran) is a village and municipality in the Gadabay Rayon of Azerbaijan.  It has a population of 2,659.  The municipality consists of the villages of Arıqıran and Əyrivəng.

References 

Populated places in Gadabay District